Jello Krahmer (born 19 November 1995 in Stuttgart) is a heavy weight German Greco-Roman wrestler. He won the Thor Masters tournament in 2020 and is the bronze medal winner of the 2020 European Wrestling Championships in his weight class. Krahmer trains at ASV Schorndorf in Schorndorf, Germany, coached by Sedat Sevsay.

Career
Jello Krahmer was born in 1995 in Hedelfingen near Stuttgart (Germany) and was raised in Lorch (Württemberg). As a school boy his mother introduced him to wrestling in Schorndorf.

In spring 2017, being his second participation at European championships, in the Hungarian city of Szombathely, he came within a whisker to the bronze medal. At the Juniors World Wrestling Championships in the same year in Bydgoszcz he sensationally won it. He was second in the German Championships in 2019 and won the "Thor Masters" tournament in Nykøbing Falster in 2020 which earned him the nomination for the 2020 European Wrestling Championships in Rome. There he made a dream come true to win the first medal at an international senior's championships.

After successfully completing his studies in International Sales Management and Technology at Aalen University end of 2019, Jello Krahmer is currently member of the German military's sports promotion group.

International achievements

 all competitions are held in Greco-Roman style of wrestling
 ECh – European Championships; WCh – World Championships
 130 kg is the heavy weight class in UWW classification.

German Championships
(only Senior)

References

1995 births
Living people
Sportspeople from Stuttgart
German male sport wrestlers
European Wrestling Championships medalists
Wrestlers at the 2019 European Games
European Games competitors for Germany
20th-century German people
21st-century German people